Everybody Else Is Doing It, So Why Can't We? is the debut studio album by Irish alternative rock band the Cranberries. Released on 1 March 1993 after four EPs, it is both the band's first full-length album and major label release. The album was written entirely by the band's lead singer Dolores O'Riordan and guitarist Noel Hogan. It reached number one on both the UK and Irish albums charts. The album spent a total of 86 weeks on the UK chart. On 24 June 1994, it became the fifth album in rock history to reach number one more than a year after release. At the end of 1995, it ranked as the 50th best selling album in Australia. It reached number 18 on the US Billboard 200 albums chart and stayed on this chart for 130 weeks; the album sold six million copies worldwide.

On 7 March 2018, the band's three remaining members announced they were releasing a special 25th anniversary newly remastered anniversary edition of the album, with previously unreleased material as well as other bonus material from the era of the album. However, it was delayed until late 2018, following the death of O'Riordan.

Track listing

Original release

Super Deluxe (2018)

Disc two

Disc three

Disc four

Personnel
The album's liner notes credit the following personnel:

The Cranberries
Dolores O'Riordan – lead vocals, acoustic guitar
Noel Hogan – lead guitar, backing vocals
Mike Hogan – bass guitar
Fergal Lawler – drums, percussion

Additional musicians
Mike Mahoney – additional vocals (2)

Production
Stephen Street – production, engineering
Aidan McGovern – additional engineering (1–5, 7–12)

Charts

Weekly charts

Year-end charts

Certifications

Notes

References

1993 debut albums
Albums produced by Stephen Street
The Cranberries albums
Island Records albums
Jangle pop albums